A superyacht or megayacht is a large and luxurious pleasure vessel.

Superyachts are often available for charter with a staff that caters to guests at a high standard of comfort. They may be designed to emphasize comfort, speed, or expedition capability. Depending on the season, superyachts may be most frequently found in the Mediterranean or the Caribbean. Many are available for charter at prices that exceed 100,000 per week. Larger examples may have more than one swimming pool; they may carry a variety of water toys, other boats, and some a helicopter.

History

At the beginning of the 20th century, when wealthy individuals constructed large private yachts for personal pleasure, some manufacturers, such as  Cox & King and Charles L. Seabury and Company, were noted for their large steam yachts.

 Overview 

The code regulates the equipping of such vessels, both at sea and in port—including such matters as crew duty times and the presence of a helicopter on board. The code has different levels of standard for vessels above and below 500 gross tons. Other countries have standards similar to LY2. Whereas yachts of 24 metres and below may be constructed of fiberglass, larger yachts are more likely to be constructed of steel, aluminum or composite fiber-reinforced plastic.

Whereas "commercial" large yachts may carry no more than 12 passengers, "private" yachts are solely for the pleasure of the owner and guests do not carry the passenger restriction. Yachts may be identified by flag—the country under which a yacht is registered. An industry publication categorizes superyachts by size, by speed, as "explorer" yachts, as sailing yachts, and classic yachts.

As of 2016, there were about 10,000 superyachts over 24 metres in length, worldwide. Of these about 80% were power yachts. The annual production rate was reported to be around 150. The largest yacht by displacement was the 20,361 gross ton Fulk Al Salamah.

As superyachts have increased in size, so have the informal terms that describe their size evolved to include "megayacht", "gigayacht" and (speculatively) "terayacht".

 Businesses 

Between 1998 and 2008, European production of superyachts grew by 228%, ending the period with a total production of 916 units and $10 billion in orders. In January 2020, Boat International'' listed 4,621 professionals connected to the superyacht industry since 1856, including 1,806 builders. The top ten builders were (shown with the total number of units built, since the founding of the company):

Superyacht builders and yacht charter companies are predominantly based in Western Europe and the United States but are also found in Australia, New Zealand, Asia, and Eastern Europe.

Distribution 

Each superyacht has a flag state where it is registered, but may have never visited. Common flag state registrars for large yachts are Cayman Islands, Marshall Islands, Isle of Man, and the British Virgin Islands, among others.

Superyachts typically frequent the Mediterranean Sea in summer and the Caribbean Sea in winter. Typical destinations in Spain and the French,  Italian and Portuguese Rivieras include Cannes, Antibes, St. Tropez, Monte Carlo, Portofino, Porto Cervo, Cascais, Puerto Banús, Puerto Portals, and Palma, Mallorca; explorer superyachts may cruise in remote areas worldwide.

Charter

Some yachts are used exclusively by their private owners, others are operated all year round as charter businesses, and a large number are privately owned but available for charter part-time. As of 2018, superyacht charter costs were 70–550 thousand per week. Charter contracts usually include an advance provisioning allowance—a deposit to cover such operating expenses as food, fuel, and berthing. The unspent balance of the allowance is returned to the customer at the end of the charter.

The luxury yacht charter industry functions effectively because private yacht owners mitigate their running costs with charter income as well as keeping their yachts and crew in top running order. Conversely, private charterers charter yachts (rather than owning them) because it is generally considered to be less expensive, and less hassle, than owning a yacht and it also provides them with extra choice related to yacht type, location and crew. The vessels may do short cruises with the owners and/or guests aboard. Antigua is one of the main ports in the Windward Islands of the Caribbean and hosts a Charter Show at the beginning of the winter season.

Design and layout

The size and types of accommodations, amenities and number of water toys increases with boat size.

40 metres
A  superyacht may have  cabins for 10–12 guests and for a crew of a similar size. This type of yacht may be configured, as follows:

Lower deck: exterior swimming platform at the stern; four (sometimes five) guest cabins with en-suite bath aft; engine room amidships; crew quarters forward.
Main deck: sheltered exterior deck aft leading into the saloon; dining room and galley; entrance amidships; owner's suite forward, usually includes a study, and sometimes a second stateroom for a personal assistant/bodyguard.
Upper deck: exterior deck aft, often used for outdoor dining; second saloon (often called the sky lounge); sixth stateroom will be amidships if it is not on the lower deck or part of the owner's suite; captain's cabin; bridge.
Sun deck: the uppermost deck, often features a hot tub and sometimes a glass-enclosed gym (which can also be below decks or even part of the owner's suite).

50 metres
A  yacht may have one or more yacht tenders for reaching shore and other water toys which may include a speed boat or sailing boat, personal water craft, windsurfing and diving equipment and a banana boat. Such yachts have multiple screen displays and satellite communications.

60 metres
Yachts above  are typically built to individual specifications, cost tens of millions of dollars, and typically have four decks above the waterline and one or two below. There is likely to be a helicopter landing platform. Apart from additional guest cabins, which are likely to include one or more "VIP suites" besides the owner's suite, such a yacht will have some or all of the following amenities: indoor hot tubs, sauna and steam rooms, a beauty salon, massage and other treatment rooms, a medical centre, a disco (usually the same space as the sky lounge or saloon, transformed into a dance area when furnishings are moved aside and special lighting activated), a cinema, plunge pool (possibly with a wave-maker), a playroom, and additional living areas such as a separate bar, secondary dining room, private sitting rooms or a library.

Support vessel 

Superyachts may be accompanied by a support (or shadow) vessel that carries such items as watercraft, helicopters or other large items that the yacht itself cannot readily accommodate. There are at least four manufacturers that specialize in building such vessels. One  example included the following amenities: a helicopter deck, six guest rooms, two-story helicopter hangar with sound system, movie theater, freshwater pool, a landing craft, four each of: jet skis,  kayaks, sailboats, diving and fishing gear, and water skis. For use ashore, there were reportedly a two-seater automobile, two motor scooters and two bicycles. The vessel also featured a  crane.

Crew

The crew of a superyacht comprises five elements, each with its own staff: the captain, who has overall responsibility for the yacht; the chef, who is responsible for the cuisine; the interior staff, who create a hotel-like environment; the deck crew, which operates and maintains the vessel; and the engineers, who ensure the proper functioning of the vessel's many systems.  A superyacht may be maintained by its crew, which may be reduced in size during the periods that the owners are not on board and no charters are booked. Most crew members live on board and are paid a monthly salary, with most living expenses covered by the owner. Live-on-board crews do not pay rent, food, electricity or water bills.

All superyachts have crew areas below deck, which consist of a crew mess, crew cabins and laundry. While most crew cabins contain bunk beds, there are captains and chief engineers who, on the larger yachts, have their own cabins. There are no set hours that crew members work each week. The hours depend greatly on how often the owners are on board, how often it is chartered and on what hours the captain sets when there are no guests on board. Crew members may be hired through crew agencies or various websites.

See also

List of motor yachts by length
List of large sailing yachts
List of sailboat designers and manufacturers

References

Further reading

External links
Alphabetical list of "luxury yachts"

Boat types
Yachts
Luxury